Cheshmeh Sefid-e Sofla may refer to:

Cheshmeh Sefid-e Sofla, Kermanshah
Cheshmeh Sefid-e Sofla, Lorestan